Cemal Yilmaz (born 1 October 1968) is a Dutch former footballer who played as a midfielder.

Career

Yilmaz started his career with Dutch top flight side PSV, where he made 4 league appearances and scored 0 goals. On 5 December 1987, Yilmaz debuted for PSV during a 7–0 win over FC Dordrecht. In 1989, he signed for Sarıyer in the Turkish top flight. In 1990, he signed for Dutch second tier club RBC.

References

External links
 Cemal Yilmaz at playmakerstats.com

1968 births
Association football midfielders
Dutch footballers
Dutch people of Turkish descent
Eerste Divisie players
Eredivisie players
Living people
PSV Eindhoven players
RBC Roosendaal players
Sarıyer S.K. footballers